David Alexander Beckmann (born 27 April 2000) is a German racing driver currently signed to Avalanche Andretti Formula E and TAG Heuer Porsche Formula E Team as a reserve driver in Formula E.

Career

Karting
Beckmann began karting in 2008, collecting major karting wins in 2009, 2012 and 2014. He remained in karting until 2014.

Formula 4

In 2015, Beckmann graduated to single seaters in ADAC Formula 4 and Italian F4, racing with Mücke Motorsport. He ended the seasons fourth in Italian F4 and fifth in ADAC Formula 4, as well as taking the rookie championship in the latter.

FIA European Formula 3 Championship

In December 2015, it was announced Beckmann would graduate to European Formula 3 for 2016, whilst continuing his collaboration with Mücke. On account of his age, Beckmann was forced to miss the first two rounds of the season, making his debut at the third round at Pau. Nonetheless, Beckmann claimed a fastest lap and two podiums to finish seventh in the Rookie Championship and fifteenth overall. For 2017, Beckmann continued to race in European Formula 3, but switched to Van Amersfoort Racing. After three rounds where he failed to score a point with the outfit, Beckmann made a mid-season change to Motopark where he fared better, amassing 45 points and ending up 16th in his second year in the category.

GP3 Series 

For 2018 Beckmann partnered Juan Manuel Correa and Tatiana Calderón at Jenzer Motorsport in the final year of the GP3 Series. Having scored 12 points after the fourth round of the championship, Beckmann switched over to Trident. His results improved drastically, and the German achieved three race wins as well as another podium, which led him to fifth in the standings.

FIA Formula 3 Championship

2019 

In 2019, Beckmann competed for the French team ART Grand Prix in the newly formed FIA Formula 3 Championship.

2020 
In 2020, he returned to Formula 3, this time with Trident, and finished sixth overall after two wins and four further podium finishes.

FIA Formula 2 Championship

2021 
In 2021, Beckmann moved up to the FIA Formula 2 Championship with the Czech team Charouz Racing System, where was joined by Guilherme Samaia. Throughout the first half of the season Beckmann showed impressive performances, such as a third-place finish in his debut race at Sakhir and second place in race 2 in Baku, which, along with two further points finishes, propelled him to 13th in the standings after four rounds. At the start of September however it was announced Enzo Fittipaldi would replace Beckmann from the next round at Monza, due to the German having to shift his focus to the family business for financial issues. But just a few days before the start of that weekend Beckmann signed up to race for Campos in place of Matteo Nannini. He competed for the Spanish team in the next two rounds, scoring a best finish of fifth at Monza, although Beckmann would ultimately be unable to finish his season, being replaced by Olli Caldwell. The German ended the campaign 15th in the standings.

2022 

In 2022, Beckmann originally made four cameo appearances, but had later been announced as a permanent driver. The first of which he drove for Charouz's No. 23 car at Imola in place of Cem Bölükbaşı, finishing 8th in the feature race. He then drove for Van Amersfoort Racing's No. 25 car at Silverstone in place of Amaury Cordeel. He would then compete again for the same team, but in the No. 24, at Le Castellet and Budapest in place of Jake Hughes. However, Van Amersfoort Racing decided to replace Hughes with Beckmann for the rest of the season, starting at Spa-Francorchamps, thus his cameo deputization driver role would become a permanent driver role until the final round at Abu Dhabi, where he would be replaced by Juan Manuel Correa.

Formula E 
In February 2022, on the week of the Mexico City ePrix, Beckmann was announced to be the test and reserve driver of the Avalanche Andretti Formula E team.

For the 2022-23 season, Beckmann continued his duties with Andretti, whilst also joining Porsche as a reserve driver.

Karting record

Karting career summary

Racing record

Racing career summary

* Season still in progress.

Complete Italian F4 Championship results 
(key) (Races in bold indicate pole position) (Races in italics indicate fastest lap)

Complete ADAC Formula 4 Championship results 
(key) (Races in bold indicate pole position) (Races in italics indicate fastest lap)

Complete FIA Formula 3 European Championship results
(key) (Races in bold indicate pole position) (Races in italics indicate fastest lap)

Complete Macau Grand Prix results

Complete GP3 Series results
(key) (Races in bold indicate pole position) (Races in italics indicate fastest lap)

Complete FIA Formula 3 Championship results
(key) (Races in bold indicate pole position; races in italics indicate points for the fastest lap of top ten finishers)

† Driver did not finish the race, but was classified as he completed over 90% of the race distance.
‡ Half points awarded as less than 75% of race distance was completed.

Complete FIA Formula 2 Championship results 
(key) (Races in bold indicate pole position) (Races in italics indicate fastest lap)

References

External links 
  (In German)
 

2000 births
Living people
People from Iserlohn
Sportspeople from Arnsberg (region)
German racing drivers
ADAC Formula 4 drivers
Italian F4 Championship drivers
FIA Formula 3 Championship drivers
FIA Formula 3 European Championship drivers
German GP3 Series drivers
FIA Formula 2 Championship drivers
Mücke Motorsport drivers
Van Amersfoort Racing drivers
Motopark Academy drivers
Jenzer Motorsport drivers
Trident Racing drivers
ART Grand Prix drivers
Charouz Racing System drivers
Campos Racing drivers
Racing drivers from North Rhine-Westphalia
Walter Lechner Racing drivers
Karting World Championship drivers
FIA World Endurance Championship drivers
Jota Sport drivers